Juan Cruz Mascia Paysée (born 3 January 1994) is a Uruguayan professional footballer who plays as a forward.

Club career 
Juan was born in Ottawa to Uruguayan parents, and came through the youth system at Miramar Misiones. He was promoted to the first team in the 2010–11 Uruguayan Primera División season, making two substitute appearances in the campaign.

His debut came in a 5–2 loss against Danubio F.C. on 20 February 2011, when he was a 64th-minute substitute. His second match of the 2010–11 season, again as a substitute, was a 0–0 draw with Bella Vista on 8 May 2011. This was his first appearance in home stadium  Parque Luis Méndez Piana. He scored his first goal with Miramar Misiones on 22 December 2011 against Deportivo Maldonado in the 2011–12 season of the Uruguayan Segunda División.

NorthEast United FC
On 27 August 2018, Mascia moved abroad and joined Indian Super League franchise NorthEast United FC. On 30 October 2018, Mascia made his debut for the club on away win against Delhi Dynamos. On 23 November 2018, he scored his first goal for the club against Kerala Blasters in the final moments of the game after coming as a substitute and hence, earned the nickname 'Super Sub Mascia'. He is also called 'Boot Jolokia' after Bhoot Jolokia for his goal against Kerala Blasters by the fans. Along with teammate Bartholomew Ogbeche and compatriot Federico Gallego, he formed one of the best attacking combinations for the club.

Chacarita Juniors
In June 2019 his transfer was announced to Chacarita Juniors of Uruguay.

International career 
Juan entered the Uruguay under-15s in 2009 and his first official international tournament was the 2009 South American Under-15 Football Championship in which he played six matches and scored three goals.
Juan is a prolific goalscorer for the Uruguay under-17s. He was the top goalscorer, with six goals, in the 2011 South American Under-17 Football Championship, which was held in Ecuador. His first tournament goals came against the Bolivia under-17s on 15 March 2011. In this match he scored both Uruguay goals in a 2–0 group stage victory. He scored another double in a 3–2 win against the Colombia under-17s in a final group stage game on 6 April 2011, helping Uruguay finish the competition as runners up to champions Brazil.

He also represented Uruguay in the 2011 FIFA U-17 World Cup in Mexico. He scored against the Canada under-17s in the group stage on 19 June 2011. Uruguay advanced to the final of the high-status tournament, where they lost 2–0 to hosts Mexico under-17s on 10 July 2011.

Reputation 
Following his success at under-17 level, Juan is a reported transfer target for clubs in England, Spain and Italy. He has also been favourably compared to 2010 FIFA World Cup star Diego Forlán in the English and South American media. For example, in April and May 2011 articles, the UK tabloid The Daily Mirror and the  FIFA website referred to him as the "new Forlán" and the "Forlán's heir" respectively. In the same month, Uruguay newspaper El Observador reported that Forlán was, in fact, a keen admirer of the player and had arranged for him to attend a training session with Atlético Madrid.

Career statistics

Achievements 

Uruguay U17
FIFA Under-17 World Cup runner-up: 2011
South American Under-17 Football Championship runner-up: 2011Uruguay U23Pan American Games: 2015Individual'''
South American Under-17 Football Championship top goalscorer: 2011 South American Under-17 Football Championship

References

External links 

1994 births
Living people
Uruguayan footballers
Footballers from Montevideo
Soccer players from Ottawa
Association football forwards
Canadian people of Uruguayan descent
Sportspeople of Uruguayan descent
Uruguayan Primera División players
Miramar Misiones players
Club Nacional de Football players
Montevideo Wanderers F.C. players
El Tanque Sisley players
Plaza Colonia players
Indian Super League players
NorthEast United FC players
Chacarita Juniors footballers
Uruguay youth international footballers
Pan American Games gold medalists for Uruguay
Footballers at the 2015 Pan American Games
Pan American Games medalists in football
Uruguayan expatriate footballers
Uruguayan expatriate sportspeople in India
Expatriate footballers in India
Medalists at the 2015 Pan American Games